Morticia Addams (née Frump) is a fictional character from the Addams Family multimedia franchise created by American Charles Addams in 1933. She plays the role of the family's reserved matriarch. Morticia Addams has been portrayed by several actresses in various Addams Family media, including Carolyn Jones in the television series The Addams Family (1964), Anjelica Huston in the feature films The Addams Family (1991) and Addams Family Values (1993), and Catherine Zeta-Jones in the streaming television series Wednesday (2022).

Cartoons
Morticia first appeared in Charles Addams' newspaper cartoons as the stern, aloof matriarch of the family. She often appeared with the rest of the family, and was, along with Gomez and Grandmama, one of the few members to actually speak in the cartoons.

Background 

Morticia is the wife of Gomez Addams and mother of Wednesday, Pugsley and Pubert Addams. The character originated in the Charles Addams cartoons for The New Yorker magazine in the 1930s. In the cartoons, none of the family members had names. When the characters were adapted to the 1964 television series, Charles Addams' selection of her name was inspired by "mortician". Morticia's maiden name is "Frump" and she has an older sister named Ophelia (also played by Carolyn Jones in the original TV series). In the television series, her mother was named Hester Frump (played by Margaret Hamilton). Her mother-in-law is Grandmama Addams. In the 1990s Addams Family films, familial relationships are changed for the characters of Grandmama and Fester. Grandmama is actually Morticia's mother, not Gomez's, while Fester is Gomez's brother, not Morticia's uncle.

Morticia is described as a witch; she is slim, with extremely pale skin and long flowing straight black hair. In one episode she is seen wearing a black pointed hat. She commonly wears black hobble dresses to match her hair, tightly form fitting, with a fringe of octopus-like cloth "tentacles" at the lower hem. According to Wednesday, Morticia applies baking powder to her face instead of actual makeup. In each episode, she easily allures her husband Gomez by speaking French (or any other foreign language for that matter). Morticia is musically inclined, and is often seen freely strumming a Japanese shamisen. She frequently enjoys cutting the buds off of roses, which she discards (keeping only the stems), likes cutting out paper dolls with three heads and making sweaters with three arms, collecting the mail from the hand-in-the-box Thing, and cooking unusual concoctions for her husband, including eye of newt. Her personal pet is Cleopatra, a fictitious breed of carnivorous plant called an African Strangler, to which she feeds hamburgers and various other meats.

Morticia's family tree can be traced back to Salem, Massachusetts, and witchcraft is also implied at times in the television series.  For example, Morticia likes to "smoke," an activity that does not involve cigarettes or cigars (such as her husband frequently enjoys), but smoke instead emanates directly from her.

In 2009, she was included in Yahoo!'s Top 10 TV Moms from Six Decades of Television for the time period 1964–1966. AOL named her one of the 100 Most Memorable Female TV Characters.

In other media 

Morticia was portrayed by Carolyn Jones in the TV series, and Halloween with the New Addams Family TV movie.  According to the 60s TV series, Morticia first met Gomez when she and her elder sister, Ophelia, were brought to the Addams' Mansion by their mother Mrs. Frump, a long-time close friend of Gomez' mother, both of whom wished to matchmake their children, Gomez and Ophelia, together.  

Anjelica Huston portrays Morticia in The Addams Family and its sequel Addams Family Values. Huston's portrayal of Morticia was always illuminated by a ghostly glow around the eyes, which became most noticeable when she was standing or lying in dim light (just like Bela Lugosi in 1931's Dracula).  According to the 1991 movie, Morticia first met Gomez when she was attending his cousin Balthazar's funeral (and Gomez was the main suspect); Morticia and Gomez couldn't keep their eyes off-of each-other and, according to Gomez, everyone hardly paid Balthazar any attention as he was buried, and Gomez proposed to Morticia later that very night.  

Daryl Hannah played Morticia in the 1998 film Addams Family Reunion. 

Canadian actress Ellie Harvie played Morticia in the 1998-1999 revival series, The New Addams Family. 

In the first animated series made in 1973, Morticia was voiced by Janet Waldo. 

Jones also voiced this character in an episode of The New Scooby-Doo Movies that featured the family. 

In the 1992 animated series, she was voiced by Nancy Linari. 

In the 2010 Broadway musical, Morticia was portrayed by Bebe Neuwirth. Brooke Shields replaced her in the role of Morticia on June 28, 2011.

Morticia was also one of the inspirations for the Disney character Magica De Spell, first designed and drawn by Carl Barks for the Donald Duck universe. Natasha Fatale, a villain from the Rocky and Bullwinkle cartoons, was also based on Morticia's design.

Morticia is voiced by Charlize Theron in The Addams Family (2019). Theron reprised her role in the sequel, which was released on October 1, 2021.

Catherine Zeta-Jones portrays Morticia in the Netflix series Wednesday. According to the 2022 series, both she and Gomez first met at Nevermore Academy, a boarding school for supernatural people (also known as "Outcasts").  It is revealed in flashbacks that she and Gomez were involved in the death of "normie" Garrett Gates, who tried to kill Gomez in a blind rage, desiring Morticia for himself. Principal Weems was very jealous of Morticia, since they were roommates, due to her many achievements. Morticia's supernatural ability is receiving psychic visions of the past or future, just like Wednesday, and is hereditary on both sides of the family. Morticia tells her daughter that the mood and tone of their visions are based on the recipient's attitude, so hers tend to be happier in nature than Wednesday's.

Relationships

Family tree

See also 
 Vampira
 Elvira
 Lily Munster

References

External links 
 Morticia Addams at the IMDb (Archived)

Comics characters introduced in 1938
The Addams Family characters
Female characters in comics
Female characters in film
Female characters in television
Fictional artists
Fictional horticulturists and gardeners
Fictional musicians
Fictional witches